The Sahara Beach, is a sandy beach located north of Lopar on the Adriatic island of Rab in the northern part of the Croatian coast.
Clothing is optional at Sahara Beach.
Due to difficult access to the beach, there are mostly few visitors, even in July and August.
You can access the beach by hiking about 40 min. from the town of Lopar. Usually quite a lot of boats are anchored in the bay.

Next to Sahara Beach you find other small beaches, some of them are nude beaches too.

The nearest town, Lopar, is well known for its family-friendly, sandy beaches.

References

External links 
Sahara - naturist beach in Lopar
Sahara - the unique view of the landscape
Sahara and other beaches on island Rab

Beaches of Croatia
Rab